Bimkom - Planners for Planning Rights is an Israeli human rights organization formed in 1999 by a group of professional planners and architects, in order to strengthen democracy and human rights in the field of spatial planning and housing policies, in Israel and in Area C of the West Bank, which is under Israeli control. Drawing on values of social justice, good governance, equality and community participation, Bimkom advances the development of planning policies and practices that are more just and respectful of human rights, and responsive to the needs of local communities. Bimkom strives to assist the weakest sectors of society through research and reports, community planning assistance and through awareness raising among planning authorities. Bimkom works with both Jewish and Arab communities among others, in attaining fair, equitable and appropriate planning of the physical spaces in which they live.

Bimkom's work in partnership with other NGOs has led to the recognition of 11 unrecognized  Bedouin villages and better planning for recognized villages.

Bimkom's Center for Planning Support in the Arab sector assisted several townships, including Yarka, Arara, Baka al-Garbiyyah and Qalansawe, to obtain expansion of their respective development areas.

Bimkom, together with other social change organizations, introduced into the Urban Renewal Authority Law a number of measures designed to protect low-income residents.

Bimkom orchestrated cooperation between community organizations, international funding and the Jerusalem municipality that lead to the opening of the first playground in Sur Baher, a Palestinian neighborhood in East Jerusalem.

Bimkom succeeded in having the villages of Dahr el-Maleh and Sateh al-Baher in Area C connected to the electricity grid.

Bimkom is funded by a variety of private and state-based foundations and funding organs.

Bimkom is an accredited Israel NGO.

See also
New Israel Fund
Bustan
Projects working for peace among Israelis and Arabs

References

External links

https://bimkom.org/eng/our-mission/

Human rights organizations based in Israel
1999 establishments in Israel